Yemelyantsevo is a rural locality (a village) in Nagornoye Rural Settlement, Petushinsky District, Vladimir Oblast, Russia. The population was 6 as of 2010. There are 5 streets.

Geography 
Yemelyantsevo is located on the Volga River, 18 km west of Petushki (the district's administrative centre) by road. Marochkovo is the nearest rural locality.

References 

Rural localities in Petushinsky District